"Toodle-Fucking-Oo" is the sixteenth episode of the HBO original series The Sopranos and the third of the show's second season. It was written by Frank Renzulli, directed by Lee Tamahori, and originally aired on January 30, 2000.

Starring
 James Gandolfini as Tony Soprano
 Lorraine Bracco as Dr. Jennifer Melfi
 Edie Falco as Carmela Soprano
 Michael Imperioli as Christopher Moltisanti
 Dominic Chianese as Corrado Soprano Jr.
 Vincent Pastore as Pussy Bonpensiero
 Steven Van Zandt as Silvio Dante
 Tony Sirico as Paulie Gualtieri
 Robert Iler as Anthony Soprano Jr.
 Jamie-Lynn Sigler as Meadow Soprano
 Drea de Matteo as Adriana La Cerva
 David Proval as Richie Aprile
 Aida Turturro as Janice Soprano
 Nancy Marchand as Livia Soprano

Guest starring

Synopsis
Dr. Melfi has been dining in a restaurant with some female friends and is a little tipsy. On the way out, she sees Tony at a table with his companions, and awkwardly attempts small talk. Leaving, she waves and calls "Toodle-oo!" The men make crude comments about her, and Tony pretends she is an old girlfriend. Melfi is mortified by her behavior, and acknowledges to her therapist, Dr. Elliot Kupferberg, that in order to evade her responsibility as a therapist, she behaved like "a ditzy young girl."

Meadow throws a party for a few friends in Livia's house. However, a lot of uninvited people show up, there is drug use and heavy drinking, and the police arrive. An officer who knows Tony contacts him. Tony finds Meadow drunk and drives her home, but he and Carmela do not know how to punish her. She prompts them to take away her credit card for three weeks, while still providing cash for gas. She walks away, smiling to herself.

At first, Janice defends Meadow, saying she is showing her independence, but when she sees the state of the house, she is furious. Tony and Carmela tell her to stop interfering. Janice says she ought to leave, but she and Carmela later reconcile and she is persuaded to continue to stay at the house. Meadow overhears their argument and when Tony goes to the house to have the locks changed, he finds her scrubbing the floor. He turns away, perplexed by this remorse.

Jackie Aprile's elder brother Richie is released after ten years' imprisonment. He says he has mellowed out by taking up meditation and yoga, but he cannot accept that Tony, a younger man, is the boss and that he does not immediately get the same benefits as before. When Tony says these things will come in time, Richie says, "What's mine is not yours to give me."

Richie demands payments from a former associate, "Beansie" Gaeta, now the proprietor of pizzerias. When Beansie refuses, Richie viciously assaults him. Another night, he waits in a parking lot and threatens Beansie with a gun, but he manages to escape. Later, Beansie returns to his car, but Richie rams into him and then drives over him as he lies on the ground. In the hospital, Beansie is told he may never walk again. Tony then asserts his authority over Richie and tells him there will be a problem if he does not show respect.

Between the two assaults on Beansie, Richie meets with Junior, and pledges his loyalty to him. Richie happens to meet Janice at a yoga class and begins trying to revive the relationship they had years ago.

First appearances
 Richie Aprile: The late Jackie Aprile Sr.'s older brother, who is paroled from prison after a 10-year sentence.
 Peter "Beansie" Gaeta: a pizzeria owner and Mafia associate of Richie Aprile, Jackie Aprile Sr., and Tony Soprano.
 Dr. Elliot Kupferberg: Dr. Melfi's colleague and psychotherapist.
 Dr. Douglas Schreck: Junior Soprano's cardiologist.

Title reference
 "Toodle-oo" is an informal form of "good-bye". An annoyed Melfi adds her own twist on the saying while mulling over her run-in with Tony.

Production
 David Proval (Richie Aprile) is now billed in the opening credits.
 Proval originally auditioned to play the role of Tony Soprano. He was turned down because creator David Chase felt he looked "too right" for the part.

Connections to future episodes
 When meeting with Tony at the mall, Richie reminds Tony that he helped Tony and Richie's brother Jackie get a "pass" after robbing a card game of DiMeo capo "Feech" La Manna. This is the first reference to a story retold with more detail in later seasons.

Music
 The song played when Tony arrives on the scene of the party at Livia's is "Holla Holla" by Ja Rule.
 The song played while the girls cook in the kitchen is "No Scrubs" by TLC.
 The "Optimistic Voices" number from the 1939 classic The Wizard of Oz is heard in Dr. Melfi's dream.
 The song played during Richie Aprile's homecoming at the Bada Bing and over the end credits is "Viking" by Los Lobos.
 The song played when Carmela and Janice apologize to one another is "Never Miss the Water" by Chaka Khan.
 The song played when Janice arrives at Livia's house is "Prince of Peace" by Pharoah Sanders.

Filming locations 
Listed in order of first appearance:

 Verona, New Jersey
 Paterson, New Jersey
 North Caldwell, New Jersey
 Satriale's Pork Store in Kearny, New Jersey
 Garden State Plaza in Paramus, New Jersey
 Satin Dolls in Lodi, New Jersey
 Montclair, New Jersey
 Long Island City, Queens

References

External links
"Toodle-Fucking-Oo"  at HBO

The Sopranos (season 2) episodes
2000 American television episodes

fr:Au Plaisir